The  University of Port Harcourt is located in Choba in Port Harcourt, Rivers state, Nigeria.  It was established in 1975 as  University College, Port Harcourt and was given university status in 1977. The University of Port Harcourt was ranked the sixth in Africa and the first in Nigeria by Times Higher Education in 2015. In July 2021, Prof. George Owunari was appointed substantive Vice-Chancellor of the university.

School and faculties

The university originally had six schools in 1977:

School of Humanities
School of Social Sciences
School of Biological Sciences
School of Chemical Sciences
School of Physical Sciences
School of Educational Studies
School of Science Laboratory Technology (SSLT)
 
It changed from a school system to a faculty system in 1982. The university now has twelve faculties:

Faculty of Humanities
Faculty of Social Sciences
Faculty of Education                                                                                                                                                               
Faculty of Engineering
Faculty of Management Sciences
College of Health Sciences
Faculty of Basic Medical Sciences
Faculty of Science
Faculty of Dentistry
Faculty of Pharmacy
Faculty of Agriculture
Faculty of Law

Faculties and departments 
List of Faculties and Departments in tabular format:

Notable alumni

Notable faculty

Vice Chancellor 
Prof. Professor Georgewill Owunari  - 2021 ~ Present

Former vice chancellors 
Prof. Stephen Okodudu- (Acting) 2020 ~2021
Prof. Ndowa Lale  - 2015 ~ 2020
Prof. Joseph Atubokiki Ajienka  - 2010 ~ 2015
 Prof. Don Baridam - 2005 ~ 2010
Prof. Nimi Briggs  - 2000 ~ 2005
 Prof. Theo Vincent - 1996 ~ 2000
Prof. Nimi Briggs  - (Acting) 1995 ~ 1996
 Prof. Ademola Salau - (Acting) 1994 ~ 1995
Prof. Njidda M. Gadzama - (Acting) 1992 ~ 1994
Prof. Kelsey Harrison - 1989 ~ 1992
Prof. Sylvanus J. Cookey  - 1982 ~ 1989
Prof. Donald E. U. Ekong  - 1977 ~ 1982

Library 
The objective of the library is derived from those of its parent institution, the University of Port Harcourt.  It exists to provide books, non-book/electronic resources and ancillary services which are invaluable in extending and supporting the university’s programmes of teaching, learning and Research.

Affiliate institutions
In 1981 an affiliation protocol was approved between University of Port Harcourt and the then College of Education, Uyo in the old Cross River State. That protocol produced graduates in Education in 1985 (see 6th Convocation brochure)  and 1986. The affiliation was terminated by the upgrade of the College of Education, Uyo to a State University in 1983 by the Administration of Dr Clement Isong. That University was named University of Cross River State (UNICROSS), Uyo. When it was taken over by the Federal Government in 1991, it became what is today known as the University of Uyo (UNIUYO). Ever since, Uniport has nurtured programmes in other affiliate institutions.

Below are a list of affiliate institutions of the University of Port Harcourt approved by the National Universities Commission (NUC).
 National Missionary Seminary of St. Paul, Gwagwalada, Abuja
 Methodists Theological institute, Umuahia
 Baptist College of Theology, Obinze, Owerri

See also
List of University of Port Harcourt people
University of Port Harcourt Teaching Hospital
Academic libraries in Nigeria

References

External links
 Official website

 
Educational institutions established in 1975
Public universities in Nigeria
1975 establishments in Nigeria
1970s establishments in Rivers State
Universities and colleges in Port Harcourt
Academic libraries in Nigeria